Jalen Crutcher (born July 18, 1999) is an American professional basketball player for the Greensboro Swarm of the NBA G League. He played college basketball for the Dayton Flyers.

Early life and high school career
Crutcher is the son of Greg and Sheila Crutcher and grew up in Memphis, Tennessee. He attended Ridgeway High School. Crutcher averaged 18 points, four assists, and two steals per game as a senior. He was a three-star recruit ranked the 65th best point guard in his class. Crutcher initially committed to Chattanooga but decommitted after coach Matt McCall left to coach UMass. Crutcher signed with Dayton after coach Anthony Grant needed a point guard at the last minute. Crutcher was also recruited by Murray State.

College career
As a freshman, Crutcher started 22 games and averaged 9.2 points, 3.1 rebounds, and 4.4 assists per game on a team that finished 14–17. Crutcher was named to the Atlantic 10 All-Rookie Team. As a sophomore, Crutcher was third on the team in scoring with 13.2 points per game and second in the Atlantic 10 in assists with 5.7 per game, in addition to his four rebounds per game. Crutcher helped the team finish with a 21–12 record and reach the NIT semifinals and he was named team MVP. He was also named to the Third Team All-Atlantic 10.

Crutcher hit a three-pointer with seconds left against Kansas in the final of the 2019 Maui Invitational Tournament to force overtime. He scored 12 points total in the 90–84 overtime loss. Crutcher missed a game against Grambling State on December 23 with a concussion. On January 17, 2020, Crutcher scored 21 points and hit the game-winning three-pointer at the buzzer to defeat Saint Louis 78–76 in overtime. Crutcher scored a career-high 24 points and also had eight rebounds and seven assists on January 25, in a 87–79 win over Richmond. He became the first Dayton player to be named Atlantic 10 player of the week on back-to-back weeks on January 27. On January 30, he had 18 points in a 73–69 win against Duquesne and surpassed the 1,000 point threshold. At the end of the regular season Crutcher was named to the First Team All-Atlantic 10. Crutcher led Dayton in minutes per game (33.6), assists per game (4.9) three-pointers (21.4 per game), three-point percentage (.468, 147–314) and free throw percentage (.869, 86–99), and was second to roommate Obi Toppin in scoring (15.1 points per game). After the season, Crutcher declared for the 2020 NBA draft while maintaining his college eligibility. On August 2, he announced he was withdrawing from the draft and returning to Dayton for his senior season.

At the end of the regular season, Crutcher repeated on the First Team All-Atlantic 10. As a senior, Crutcher averaged 17.6 points and 4.8 assists per game. He announced that he was declaring for the 2021 NBA draft and hired an agent, forgoing the extra season of eligibility the NCAA granted basketball players. Crutcher finishing 16th in career scoring with 1,593 points, fourth in made three-pointers with 242, and second in assists with 584.

Professional career

Greensboro Swarm (2021–present)
After going undrafted in the 2021 NBA draft, Crutcher joined the Milwaukee Bucks for the 2021 NBA Summer League. On October 8, 2021, he signed with the Charlotte Hornets, but was waived six days later. On October 24, he signed with the Greensboro Swarm as an affiliate player.

Career statistics

College

|-
| style="text-align:left;"| 2017–18
| style="text-align:left;"| Dayton
| 31 || 22 || 31.2 || .412 || .338 || .681 || 3.1 || 4.4 || 1.0 || .1 || 9.2
|-
| style="text-align:left;"| 2018–19
| style="text-align:left;"| Dayton
| 33 || 32 || 36.5 || .419 || .363 || .707 || 4.0 || 5.7 || .9 || .1 || 13.2
|-
| style="text-align:left;"| 2019–20
| style="text-align:left;"| Dayton
| 30 || 30 || 33.6 || .468 || .424 || .869 || 3.2 || 4.9 || .8 || .1 || 15.1
|-
| style="text-align:left;"| 2020–21
| style="text-align:left;"| Dayton
| 24 || 24 || 38.1 || .463 || .372 || .763 || 3.5 || 4.8 || .8 || .0 || 17.6
|- class="sortbottom"
| style="text-align:center;" colspan="2"| Career
| 118 || 108 || 34.7 || .441 || .375 || .769 || 3.5 || 4.9 || .9 || .1 || 13.5

References

External links
Dayton Flyers bio

1999 births
Living people
American men's basketball players
Basketball players from Memphis, Tennessee
Dayton Flyers men's basketball players
Greensboro Swarm players
Point guards